Earplugs 50¢ is the fifth album and first live album released from the band emmet swimming. It revisits more than a dozen tunes, infusing many of them with a bar band energy that seldom survived the band's studio efforts.

Track listing

Personnel
Todd Watts - Vocals, Guitar
Erik Wenberg - Guitar, backing vocals
Luke Michel - Bass
Tamer Eid - Drums
Mark Williams - Engineer

References

Emmet Swimming albums
1999 live albums